Olivia is an unincorporated community and census-designated place (CDP) in Blair County, Pennsylvania, United States. It was first listed as a CDP prior to the 2020 census.

The CDP is in northern Blair County, in the northeastern part of Snyder Township, along the north side of South Eagle Valley Road (old U.S. Route 220). The community is on the north side of the valley of Bald Eagle Creek, which flows southwestward to join the Little Juniata River in Tyrone.

Demographics

References 

Census-designated places in Blair County, Pennsylvania
Census-designated places in Pennsylvania